Kamer Sadık (1911 – September 24, 1986) was a Turkish actor of Armenian origin.

Filmography 
 1953 - Çifte Kavrulmuş
 1961 - Tenten ve Altın Post
 1962 - Kısmetin En Güzeli
 1962 - Erkeklik Öldü mü Atıf Bey
 1963 - İntikam Hırsı
 1963 - Çalınan Aşk
 1964 - Tophaneli Osman (Avukat)	
 1964 - Tığ Gibi Delikanlı
 1964 - Sokakların Kanunu (Hasan)
 1965 - Serseri Aşık
 1965 - Pantolon Bankası
 1970 - Red Kit 
 1974 - Atını Seven Kovboy (Bankacı)
 1977 - Sakar Şakir (Sabri Amca)
 1979 - Korkusuz Korkak (Mülayim Ters)

References

External links

1911 births
1986 deaths
Male actors from Istanbul
Turkish male film actors
Ethnic Armenian male actors
Turkish people of Armenian descent
Armenians from the Ottoman Empire
20th-century Turkish male actors